The Suzuki GSX-R1000 is a supersport motorcycle made by Suzuki. It was introduced in 2001 to replace the GSX-R1100 and is powered by a liquid-cooled  inline four-cylinder, four-stroke engine although originally  from 2001 to 2004.

History

2001 (K1, K2)

For 2001, Suzuki introduced a new GSX-R model that replaced the largest and most powerful model of the GSX-R series sportbike, the GSX-R1100, with the all-new GSX-R1000. The GSX-R1000 was not just an enlarged version of the GSX-R750, although it shared many features with its little brother. The mainframe is the same in both models, but the material used on the big brother was  thicker. Suzuki claimed the torsional rigidity of the frame had increased 10% in comparison with the GSX-R750.

The GSX-R1000 engine was a redesigned GSX-R750 engine. The R1000 had a  bigger bore and  longer stroke, newly designed pistons with lower crown, and gear-driven counter balancer. The redline is set at 12,000 rpm.

Using titanium for the exhaust downpipe (K1 model link pipe is black, K2 model link pipe is polished titanium) and the inside of the silencer, enabled the 1000s exhaust system to become  lighter than that of the 750. Titanium was also used in the front fork (titanium-nitride) to coat the stanchions. An exhaust tuning valve had been mounted inside the exhaust pipe. Using a servo the system dynamically adjusted the exhaust backpressure, according to engine speed, throttle position, and gear selection for increased torque, lower emissions, and decreased noise—the (stock) exhaust noise of the GSX-R1000 is notably lower than that of the GSX-R600.

With the 2001 model of the GSX-R1000, the 1998 Yamaha YZF-R1 was finally surpassed with the GSX-R being lighter and more powerful.

The 2001 model carried over to 2002 with minimal changes. 2002 introduced i.a. modifications to the fuel pump, clutch, front axle, torque link, mirrors, and luggage hooks. The manual fast-idle was replaced with a computer operated implementation (the "STV servo"). New colors, and new GSXR stickers.

2003 (K3, K4)

After the GSX-R1000 had been three years on the roads and race tracks, Suzuki put out a new version of the model in late September 2002. Suzuki engineers had been working on the three things that made a fast bike faster; weight, power, and handling. The 2003 year's GSX-R1000 was improved in all three counts. It weighed less, had more power/torque, and handled better.

The physical dimensions of the bike were almost identical to the previous year's model. The seat height and the overall height were somewhat lower but the geometry of the bike was exactly the same as before. The already rigid aluminum alloy frame was newly designed and enforced with internal ribs, also there was an updated headlight and tail fairing. The frame, as well as the wheels, were now coated black.

The front brakes were also new. Suzuki decided to drop the six-piston calipers. The new radially mounted four-piston calipers weigh 30 grams less and grip smaller  discs that save another . Though smaller, Suzuki claimed that the new brakes provide better stopping and turn-in performance.

The headlights of the 2003 year's GSX-R1000 were mounted vertically to enable the ram-air intakes in the front to be placed  nearer the bike's centerline. The new design was very much inspired by the look of the Hayabusa. The instruments were also redesigned.

The cylinder displacement of the engine remained the same , but more power/torque and better throttle response had been achieved by adding four ventilation holes between the cylinders to equalize crankcase pressure beneath the pistons, moving the air intake nearer to the centerline and upgrading the engine management system from a 16-bit to a 32-bit ECU. The entire exhaust system was now made of titanium to save an additional  and the tail light was replaced with LEDs.

The 2003 model carried over to 2004 without any significant improvements.

2005 (K5, K6)

The 2005 model year GSX-R1000 had a redesigned engine and chassis. It had  lower weight than the previous model and the engine had an  larger displacement due to a 0.4mm bore increase. It had a totally new frame reducing the total length of the bike by  but reducing its wheelbase only . There were new brakes with radial mounted calipers and  discs at the front. The new titanium silencer (catalytic in Europe) was said to be designed to reduce turbulence to minimum. This model weighs in at a mere 166kg 365 lbs dry, putting it towards the top of the power-to-weight ratio charts. 

Also in 2005 Suzuki used a single "S" logo on the tank on all models instead of The brand's full name.

The 2005 model carried over to 2006 without any significant improvements other than a few appearance changes.

In the list of fastest production motorcycles by acceleration, a 2006 Suzuki GSX-R1000 at a drag strip a 2006 model once recorded a 0 to 60 mph  time of 2.35 seconds. Relaxed current record. This is the only GSX-R1000 that has won a title to championnat du monde de Superbike.

2007 (K7, K8)

On September 22, 2006, Suzuki revealed a significantly updated GSX-R1000 for 2007 at the Paris motor show. The new bike gained  over the 2006 model which was due to its new exhaust system and new emissions regulations. To counter this weight increase, Suzuki claimed improved aerodynamics along with a faster revving engine and larger throttle body. Although not a completely new model, the engine and chassis have been updated. It also featured three different engine mapping configurations, selectable via two buttons located on the right handlebar. One up, and one down arrow to cycle between Mode A (unrestricted), Mode B (reduced power until 50% throttle is applied), and Mode C (reduced power throughout the rpm regardless of throttle application). It also received a hydraulic clutch.

The 2007 model carried over to 2008 without any significant improvements.

2011L¹1()
The 2017 model, introduced to reporters at EICMA in late 2016, had a significantly redesigned engine the first since the last engine update on the 2009 model. This new engine has a higher RPM limit and no balancer shaft to quell vibration, also a mechanical variable valve timing used for ten years by Suzuki in MotoGP and drive by wire throttle. This model is the first to get the addition of traction control with a (IMU) inertial measuring unit measuring yaw, roll and pitch also all lighting is now LED. Another first for any GSX-R is the use of a fuel gauge on this model. Along with the new 2017 GSX-R1000 model, Suzuki has also released an up spec model GSX-R1000R; this R model comes with a Motion Track Brake System, Bi-directional quick shifter and launch control. Also on the R model, as reported by Sport Rider, are the same Showa Balance Free Front (BFF) fork and Balance Free Rear Cushion (BFRC Lite) shock that come standard on the 2016 Kawasaki ZX-10R.

It will be illegal to register the model in the EU, EFTA, or UK from 1 January 2023 unless it is updated to comply with Euro 5. New sales are already banned in India as it does not comply with BS VI.

Specifications

Motorsport
Troy Corser won the 2005 Superbike World Championship season, and Alessandro Polita won the 2006 FIM Superstock 1000 Cup season. The bike was used by Yukio Kagayama and Kousuke Akiyoshi to win the Suzuka 8 Hours endurance race in 2007, with Kazuki Tokudome and Nobuatsu Aoki doing the same in 2009. Michael Dunlop will ride the GSXR at the 2022 Isle of Man TT Senior.

See also
List of fastest production motorcycles by acceleration

References

External links

 GSX-R1000 at Global Suzuki website
 

GSX-R1000
Sport bikes
Motorcycles introduced in 2001